The Rhythm of the Night is the debut album by Italian Eurodance act Corona, released in 1995. The album includes the worldwide hit single "The Rhythm of the Night", along with the singles "Baby Baby", "Try Me Out" and "I Don't Wanna Be a Star".

Critical reception
British newspaper Music Week gave the album 4 out of 5, writing, "Olga De Souza belts out a collection of songs from hedonistic heaven. The success of the title track and follow-up single, Baby Baby, bode well for this superior dance album."

Track listing

Personnel
Created, arranged and produced by Checco & Soul Train for a Lee Marrow production
All tracks recorded and mixed by Lee Marrow, except tracks 11–13
Engineered by Francesco Alberti at Casablanca Recordings, Italy
Graphic art: Sunrise, Italy

Charts and certifications

Weekly charts

Year-end charts

Certifications

References

External links
 The Rhythm of the Night at Discogs

1995 debut albums
Corona (band) albums